House of Reckoning is a thriller horror novel by John Saul, published by Ballantine Books on October 13, 2009. The novel follows the story of teenage Sarah Crane, who along with her friends unravels the shocking story behind an old mansion upon arriving in a new town.

Plot
When 14-year-old Sarah Crane is seriously hurt by her alcoholic father Ed, she is sent to live with a foster family. However she soon realizes that her new foster family has only taken her in for the money they receive from the county. Sarah has difficulty making friends at her new school, though connects with Nick Dunnigan, a young boy recently released from a mental facility. Sarah also befriends Bettina Phillips, who lives in an old mansion known as Shutters.

As Sarah begins spending more time at Shutters, she senses crimes that have been committed by the prison's long-dead inmates. Though as Sarah begins to look further into the mystery, two of her enemies fall victims of violence, and their town becomes thirsty for revenge.

Critical reception
Reception for House of Reckoning was mixed to positive. Kirkus Reviews said, "Anyone who's survived adolescence will take a certain pleasure in watching Saul turn all the normal fears, competitions and terrors of teenagers into supernaturally tinged Grand Guignol. The storytelling is strenuously unnuanced but undeniably powerful as it brings to vivid life an adolescent's zero-sum view of moral realities." Publishers Weekly said, "Needless to say, the mystical abilities Sarah discovers she possesses come in handy in turning the tables." Bookreporter's Ray Palen said, "Although House of Reckoning wraps itself up a little too quickly, the journey to the conflicted climax is worth the trip. Saul is at his best when he gets inside the heart and mind of his teenaged characters, and the team of Sarah Crane and Nick Dunnigan firmly represents teen angst at its darkest and most dangerous. This is a perfectly eerie tale presented just in time for the Halloween season."

References

American thriller novels
American horror novels
2009 American novels
Ballantine Books books